Tremont Township was a defunct portion of Solano County, California.  It comprised the portions of Solano County opposite Putah Creek from Davisville (now Davis).  It appears on an 1890 map of Solano County.

References

Unincorporated communities in Solano County, California
Former townships in California